Northern Romani is group of dialects of the Romani language spoken in various Northern European, Central European and Eastern European countries.

The first grammatical outline of Romani was done on Sinti variety.

Dialects
Elšík uses this classification and dialect examples (geographical information from Matras):

References

 
Romani in Europe